Diana Beverly Matheson (born April 6, 1984) is a Canadian former professional soccer player who played for the Canada national team from 2003 to 2020 and multiple professional women's teams over the course of her career. She is best known for scoring the bronze medal-winning goal for Canada in the 92nd minute against France at the 2012 Summer Olympics. She also won a bronze medal at the 2016 Rio Olympics and gold medal at the 2011 Pan American Games with the senior national team.

Early life
Born in Mississauga, Ontario, Matheson attended White Oaks Secondary School in Oakville, Ontario, where she received Principal's Award for athletics and academics. As a member of the Ontario provincial team from 1999 to 2002, she won the national championship in 2001 and was runner-up in 2002. She was captain of the team in 2002. Playing for the Oakville Women's team, Matheson was a 2002 Ontario Cup champion and club national women's champion.

Princeton University, 2004–2007
Matheson majored in economics at Princeton University in Princeton, New Jersey, and was voted  Ivy League Player of the Year in 2007 and Princeton Women's Athlete of the Year in 2008.

As a freshman in 2004, Matheson was a unanimous first-team All-Ivy selection and was named Ivy League Rookie of the Year. She earned first-team All-America and first-team All-Mid-Atlantic Region honours and was one of 12 finalists for SoccerBuzz Freshman of the Year. She was a three-time Ivy Rookie of the Week. During her sophomore year, she scored five goals, second-most on the team, and had a team-high of seven assists (ranked third in the Ivy League). She was one of only two unanimous first-team All-Ivy selections. Matheson earned SoccerBuzz first-team all-region and NSCAA second-team all-region honours. After missing the season-opening trip to Florida to play with the Canadian national team, she started all 14 games the rest of the season. As a junior in 2006, Matheson co-captained the squad and led the Tigers with eight goals and five assists for 21 points despite missing five games to train with the Canadian national team. She was a unanimous selection for first-team All-Ivy. As a senior, Matheson missed the first seven games to play in the 2007 FIFA Women's World Cup in China. After returning from the tournament, she earned a point in seven straight games of the 10 played and broke Princeton's single-game and career assist records with a four-assist performance against Rutgers. Serving as co-captain of the team, she was Princeton's third four-time first-team all-league honoree and seventh Player of the Year.

Club career

Team Strømmen, 2008–2010 
Diana Matheson played the second half of the 2008 season in Oslo, Norway, with Team Strømmen, becoming a runner-up in the Toppserien league and also in the annual Cup competition.  She rejoined the same club for the 2009 season running from April to October, and for the first half of 2010 until national team duties called her away.  She can be seen in a video made by her Norwegian team.

Washington Spirit, 2013–2016
In early 2013, it was announced that Matheson would be joining the Washington Spirit as part of the NWSL Player Allocation, a team in the newly founded National Women's Soccer League. She made her debut during the Spirit's inaugural match on April 15, 2013 against the Boston Breakers.  Her first NWSL goal came on a late penalty in the club's home opener against the Western New York Flash on April 20, 2013.  At the conclusion of the 2013 season, it was announced that Matheson had been selected as a midfielder to the NWSL 2013 Best XI First Team.

Matheson helped lead the Spirit to its first ever playoff berth in 2014 with eight goals and six assists during the regular season.

After joining the team late in 2015 due to injury and participating in the 2015 FIFA Women's World Cup, Matheson scored three goals and had two assists in just nine games.

In 2016, she scored four goals, tied for second most on the team. Matheson currently holds the records for most goals scored (23) and most assists (12) for the Spirit all-time. In 2016 the Washington Spirit advanced to the NWSL Championship game against the Western New York Flash. After extra time the game was tied 2–2 and advanced to penalties. Matheson was the fifth penalty taker for the Spirit, Washington was trailing 2–3 and needed to score to keep the match going. Her penalty was saved by Sabrina D'Angelo, securing the win for the Flash.

During the off-season, the Washington Spirit traded many of their veteran players. In January 2017, Matheson was traded to the Seattle Reign in exchange for Arielle Ship and Seattle's third round pick in the 2018 NWSL College Draft.

Seattle Reign, 2017
Matheson tore her ACL while training with the Canadian National team in February and she would miss the entire 2017 season. At the 2018 NWSL College Draft she was traded to the Utah Royals in exchange for Yael Averbuch and Utah's third round draft pick. Matheson never appeared in a game for Seattle.

Utah Royals, 2018–2020
Matheson appeared in 21 matches for Utah in 2018, she scored 2 goals. She returned to Utah for the 2019 season however she suffered a foot injury with the Canadian National team that would require surgery forcing her to miss the 2019 season.

International career

As a regular player for Canada, Matheson is remarkable for possessing the speed and skill to hold her place in an international team that is known for its physical approach to the game, despite having a height of only . Matheson made her national team debut at the Algarve Cup in March 2003. Matheson participated in the 2007 Women's World Cup, she appeared in all three of Canada's group stage matches, they finished third in their group and did not advance to the knockout round. In 2008, Matheson was named to her first Olympic Team, she appeared in all four matches for Canada as they were eliminated in the quarterfinals by the United States.

Matheson played in her second consecutive World Cup in 2011, Canada once again did not advance past the group stage. At the 2011 Pan American Games, Matheson helped Canada win the gold medal against the defending champions Brazil. The gold medal match was tied 1–1 after extra time and went to penalties. Matheson was the first player to take a penalty for Canada and scored, Canada defeated Brazil 4–3 on penalties to win their first ever Pan American Games gold medal.

Matheson was once again named to Canada's Olympic squad in 2012, where she played every minute of Canada's six matches. After Canada defeated the host team Great Britain in the quarterfinals, they suffered a last minute loss in extra time to the United States in the semifinals. In the bronze medal match against France, Matheson scored the game winning goal in the 92nd minute to defeat France 1–0, and secure Canada's first ever medal in women's soccer at the Olympic Games.

In October 2014, Matheson suffered a torn ACL in a friendly match against Japan. This injury put her participation in the 2015 World Cup, which was being held in Canada, in doubt. Matheson recovered in time to be named to Canada's squad for the World Cup. She was only fit enough to make one substitute appearance for Canada, she played the final 28 minutes in their quarterfinal loss to England.

Matheson was named to her third Olympic team in 2016, where Canada won the bronze medal for the second consecutive Olympics. Matheson earned her 200th cap for Canada on October 14, 2018, 181 of those caps were starts.

In May 2019, Canada Soccer announced that Matheson had been ruled out of the 2019 World Cup due to a foot injury that would require surgery.

In July 2021, Matheson announced her retirement from soccer.

International goals

Honours
Canada

 Summer Olympic Games: Bronze Medal, 2012 at London, 2016 at Rio de Janeiro
 Queen Elizabeth II Diamond Jubilee Medal, 2012

See also

 List of women's footballers with 100 or more caps
 List of Princeton University Olympians
 List of Olympic medalists in football
 List of 2016 Summer Olympics medal winners
 List of 2012 Summer Olympics medal winners
 List of players who have appeared in multiple FIFA Women's World Cups
 List of 2011 Pan American Games medal winners

References

Match reports

External links
 
 

 
 Washington Spirit player profile
 
 
 
 Princeton player profile

1984 births
Living people
Canadian people of Scottish descent
Canadian women's soccer players
Canada women's international soccer players
Princeton Tigers women's soccer players
Canadian expatriate sportspeople in the United States
Canadian expatriate women's soccer players
Expatriate women's soccer players in the United States
Footballers at the 2007 Pan American Games
Footballers at the 2008 Summer Olympics
Footballers at the 2011 Pan American Games
Footballers at the 2012 Summer Olympics
FIFA Century Club
2003 FIFA Women's World Cup players
2007 FIFA Women's World Cup players
2011 FIFA Women's World Cup players
2015 FIFA Women's World Cup players
Olympic soccer players of Canada
Olympic medalists in football
Olympic bronze medalists for Canada
National Women's Soccer League players
Washington Spirit players
Medalists at the 2012 Summer Olympics
Medalists at the 2016 Summer Olympics
Soccer players from Mississauga
Pan American Games gold medalists for Canada
Pan American Games bronze medalists for Canada
Footballers at the 2016 Summer Olympics
Pan American Games medalists in football
OL Reign players
Princeton University alumni
Utah Royals FC players
Women's association football midfielders
Medalists at the 2011 Pan American Games
Medalists at the 2007 Pan American Games
Kansas City Current players
Ottawa Fury (women) players
USL W-League (1995–2015) players